MS Vesterålen is a passenger vessel operated by the Norwegian-based Hurtigruten. The vessel was constructed in Harstad, Norway in 1983. She was refitted in Bremerhaven, Germany in 1989 to increase passenger capacity, and then later in 1995. As of 2010, the ship operates cruises primarily along the coast of Norway.

Winter 2019 the webcam shows the ship in the docks.

References 

1983 ships
Hurtigruten
Ships built in Norway
Passenger ships of Norway
Merchant ships of Norway

External links